A gunfighter is a man in the American Old West who had gained a reputation as being dangerous with a gun.

The Gunfighter(s) or Gunfighter(s) may also refer to:

Aircraft
 A type of fighter aircraft equipped with guns
 Westland C.O.W. Gun Fighter, 1930 fighter-interceptor

Books
The Gunfighters, by John S. Daniels 1961
The Gunfighters, by Bill Pronzini 1991

Film and television
 The Gunfighter (1917 film), American silent film starring William S. Hart
 The Gunfighter (1923 film), a 1923 American silent western film
 Gunfighters (film), a 1947 American Western film directed by George Waggner
 The Gunfighter, a 1950 American Western film starring Gregory Peck
 The Gunfighter, a 1983 Filipino film starring Lito Lapid 
 The Gunfighter (2014 film), a short film narrated by Nick Offerman
 The Gunfighters (1987 film), an American television film starring George Kennedy
 Gunfighter, a 1999 television Western directed by Christopher Coppola
 "The Gunfighters" (Doctor Who), a 1966 serial in the British science fiction television programme Doctor Who
 "The Gunfighter" (Justified), a 2012 episode of the TV series Justified
 "The Gunfighter", an episode of the TV series Bordertown

Other uses
 Gunfighter (Videopac game), a 1979 video game
 Lethal Enforcers II: Gun Fighters, a 1994 arcade game
 Gunfighter (comics), a 1948 serial comic book

See also
 Gunslinger (disambiguation)
 Shootout, also known as a gunfight